Český Jiřetín is a municipality and village in Most District in the Ústí nad Labem Region of the Czech Republic. It has about 100 inhabitants.

Administrative parts
The hamlet of Fláje is an administrative part of Český Jiřetín.

Geography

It lies in the Ore Mountains.

In the municipal territory is Fláje Reservoir, built in 1963 as a water source and flood protection. The dam is a concrete, pillar type (hollow inside), the only one of its kind in the country. It is protected as a technical monument.

The village forms a continuous built-up area with the village of Deutchgeorgenthal in Neuhausen municipality on the German side of the border.

Sport
Český Jiřetín is known for its ski resort.

Sights
The Church of Saint John the Baptist was built in 1653 and extended in 1669. It is one of the oldest and most valuable wooden sacred buildings in the country. Originally built in Fláje, it was moved to Český Jiřetín in 1969, and the church was thus saved from being flooded by the reservoir.

Notable people
Walter Gaudnek (1931–2022), Bohemian-German modern artist

References

External links

Villages in Most District
Villages in the Ore Mountains
Czech Republic–Germany border crossings
Ski areas and resorts in the Czech Republic